Susan Richards may refer to:

 Invisible Woman, a fictional character
 Sue Richards (artist) (1958–2014), Canadian artist
 Susan Richards Shreve, American novelist